Beka Kakabadze (born September 7, 1995) is a Georgian rugby union player. He plays for Clermont in Top 14.

References

1995 births
Living people
Rugby union players from Georgia (country)
ASM Clermont Auvergne players
Rugby union props